Swing Door trains, commonly known as "Dogboxes" or "Doggies", were wooden-bodied electric multiple unit (EMU) trains that operated on the suburban railway network of Melbourne, Victoria, Australia.

Swing Door cars had outward-opening doors. They were reasonably narrow, to ensure that two passing trains could not foul each other if doors were accidentally left open. At certain locations clearances were tight and there are stories of Swing Door cars losing doors that were not closed. The fleet could be seen running in any arrangement, from one car (using a double-ended M car), up to seven cars.

History

The Swing Door trains were originally  and  steam-hauled bogie passenger cars, the majority of which had been built between 1887 and 1893. The conversion process was suddenly halted in 1924, with partially-converted cars being patched up and returned to service with their original codes and numbers.

Converted Swing Door cars originally entered service with class codes such as 'AT', 'BCM', and 'ABCD', indicating both class and type. In 1921, that was largely simplified to 'M' (Motor car), 'T' (Trailer car) and 'D' (Driving trailer), the trailers being first class and motor cars second class, with some exceptions.

Fleet
The maximum size of the Swing Door train fleet was:
 144 'M' motor cars, numbered 1-164M, with gaps but including:
 First class motor cars 1, 8, 15, 46, 65, 78AM (re-coded M after 1958)
 Double-ended composite motor cars 155-159, 162-164ABM; 157-159, 162-164 were later converted to Parcel Vans 10-15CM
 32 'D' driving trailers, numbered 1-32D
 112 'T' First class and Second class 'BT' trailers, numbered 1-111, 126T (or BT)

Driving motors - AM, ACM, ABM, ABCM, BM, BCM, CM, M

M
It had been intended to convert 164 locomotive-hauled carriages, including First class and Second class cars - with and without guard's vans, as well as composite cars, to M (Motor) cars. When the conversion program was terminated, only 144 had been completed, leaving 20 gaps [5, 7, 22, 24, 27, 31, 33, 36, 38, 42, 45, 47, 52, 53, 55, 58, 59, 60, 61, 62] in the sequence. Each M car had 7 or 8 compartments, depending on the configuration of the original carriage; usually 3 compartments were allocated for smokers per car. When initially issued to service, most were designated ACM and BCM denoting either First or Second class accommodation respectively. When this system was abandoned, Motor cars all became Second class, except for six which were retained for special duties (AM), and the double-ended single units (ABM). On 10 February 1935, 18M and 44M were damaged in a serious collision at Croydon, and the bodies scrapped; the frames and electrical equipment was retained, and they were rebuilt with new bodies of the current Tait design, being renumbered 442M and 443M.

AM
Motor cars 1, 8, 15, 46, 65, and 78, were built as ACM units, and retained as First class AM cars until single-class suburban travel was introduced in 1958. In this form they were used, paired with a standard (Second class) M car, as locomotives for E trains. These trains ran to the end of the electrified overhead sections at Lilydale and Frankston, hauling non-electrified passenger trains. There the motor cars would be cut off, the remaining carriages split, and steam engines took each portion to Warburton & Healesville or Mornington & Stony Point respectively. Consequently, these six AM cars were set for 850 Amperes current load rather than the normal 650, and often the trailing motor car would be cut-out whilst starting a train to avoid excessive jolting. These motor-pairs were also occasionally used for goods trains, and sometimes an ABM would be substituted for the AM car.

ABM
In the original electrification plan a group of ten single-unit, double-ended motor cars were proposed for use on the St Kilda and Port Melbourne lines during lower-patronage periods. Records at the time, however, only show plans of steam-hauled cars being converted to trailers, single-ended driving trailers or single-ended motors of various lengths, with no double-ended variants. By 1914 a conceptual diagram had been drawn up showing double-ended composite motor cars, although no detail was given on utilisation of the vehicles if any were built. Without a guard lookout at the second driving end, the marker lights were to be installed in a canopy attached to the end of the curved roof clerestory.

This group of vehicles were to be constructed similarly to the rest of the Swing-door motor fleet, with a large guard/driver compartment at one end. However, eight of them had a small driver-only compartment added at the opposite end, all but two being rounded in the same manner as the van end. There were eight compartments with room for ten passengers each, and from the van end the layout was two First class smoking compartments, two First class non-smoking, two Second class non-smoking, two Second class smoking, then the smaller drivers’ compartment. Like the rest of the suburban electric passenger fleet, these cars were painted all-over dark red-brown, later crimson with a black underframe and moonstone grey along the windows. In the 1950s this was changed to the familiar 'tomato' red, with moonstone grey on the window frames only.

Routes where these operated included Hawthorn-Kew, Camberwell-Ashburton (later Alamein) and Eltham-Hurstbridge. While they often operated individually, they could be seen coupled to trailers and driving trailers in busier periods. 162M was a regular on the Kew roster.

When the first two cars, 2 and 3, entered service in mid-1917 they were class ABCM. In the 1921 recoding they became 156M and 157M respectively, and over the following years other cars 155M and 158M-164M were planned to be converted ex AC, BC or ABC cars. These all entered service as single-ended M-coded vehicles in the period 1921-1922. The first to be converted to double-ended operation was 162M in 1926, followed by 159M, 163M and 164M in 1929 (around the same time 157M was recoded), 155M in 1932 and 158M in 1937, each recoded to ABM as they were released from the workshops. The last two conversions retained their flat ends at the non-guard end, instead of having a full rebuild applied.

160M and 161M were never modified (including the original, uneven compartment sizes) and ran as single-ended motors until their withdrawal in 1974 and 1969 respectively.

Parcel motors CM
After World War II the population of Melbourne skyrocketed, and with it the need for increased suburban parcel traffic capacity. To answer the call, in 1955 157ABM was withdrawn from passenger service and converted to a parcel van as 10CM. In 1961 3CM was damaged, so 10CM had a raised cupola added in the middle for viewing of the overhead wiring. The design was tweaked in 1962. Otherwise, the sides were completely stripped and replaced with a similar style to that of the Tait parcel van fleet, though the car maintained its thinner body of 8’6”. Outward-swinging doors were kept, in three pairs at spacing to divide the car into four roughly equal sections though the outer two were partial driver compartments. The guard facility at the raised-roof/pantograph end was retained. When complete, 10CM was painted in blue with a thick yellow stripe along the sides, curving to a point in the middle of the ends. The number and code was adjacent to the outer sets of doors, and either side of the middle door was advertising for the Victorian Railways’ parcel services, identical to the Tait design.

162ABM, 163ABM and 164ABM were converted in a similar fashion to 155M, with new identities 11CM, 12CM and 13CM respectively, and entering service in 1957 (11CM) and 1959 (12CM and 13CM). Also in 1959, 155ABM had the controls removed when it was converted to a workmen's sleeper carriage. It became 70WW, the only Motor carriage to be so-converted, and ran in that form until December 1975.

That left 158ABM and 159ABM as the only passenger-service double-ended swing door electric cars, though not for long. They were converted to further parcels coaches as a stopgap measure while 10CM and the repaired 3CM were busy with various electrification works, and so the conversions were minimised. Instead of a full rebuild, the seats were removed and a walkway down the centre was cut between all the compartment partitions, but the cars did not have the sides replaced, and they stayed red. They were recoded to 15CM (1964) and 14CM (1963). The pair were withdrawn in 1970, and burned in 1971.

The remaining four swing-door CMs, 10-13, were kept in service until 1986. 10CM is stored awaiting restoration at Newport Workshops, while 13CM is in a similar position, stored at Moorooduc behind the Mornington railway workshops. 12CM, formerly at Mornington, was moved to Newport as a chassis only at some point in 2017/2018, and is being used as spare parts for 93M. Its body was scrapped some years prior due to poor condition.

113M & 156M, Jolimont Workshops yard pilots
156M was removed from normal passenger service in 1932, and replaced by 155M converted to ABM. It had its seating removed and the destination board replaced to show "parcels van", for use as a relief vehicle when any of the Tait CM coaches was unavailable. It spent the rest of its time as a pilot in Jolimont Yard performing shunting around the sidings and in the workshops as required, and was fitted with a second pantograph by 1948. It was never recoded to ABM, and although officially struck from the register in 1963 (along with 113M) it continued to operate in service well into the 1980s. Both vehicles were repainted into a scheme similar to the parcels vans by the late 1970s and officially allocated to the Jolimont yard pilot roster, with small lettering placed above the middle-side .

Near the end of its career, 156M was painted in all-over green in place of its previous blue scheme, though retaining the yellow stripe along the sides. The ends were painted white with a yellow outline, and the standard The Met yellow/green stripes along the lower edge of each end.   

When 113M was painted into the new livery, the destination board was altered to read "Petronius 210", as staff apparently thought that the new livery was an "illusion of progress".

Both vehicles have been preserved and are stored at Newport Workshops awaiting restoration.

Driving trailers – ACD, BCD, D
As part of the swing-door conversion project, a fleet of driving-trailer carriages were constructed.

A total of 32 carriages were eventually built to this type of design. All weighed 26t 10cwt, with capacity for 30 smoking passengers and either 40 or 50 non-smoking passengers. Externally, all carriages were 8’6” wide, and length-wise numbers 1-19 and 24-27D were 59’9” over body, 61’8” over buffers, while 20-23 and 28-32D were 9¾” shorter in both dimensions. The first group of longer cars had their bogies spaced at 45’6½” and the second long group at 43’3½”. All the shorter cars had bogies spaced at 40’0”.

These had seven or eight compartments, with a van on the end as a guard’s compartment as well as a small area reserved for the driver. The drivers’ compartment took the first 2’10½” and about half the width of the carriage, with the guard’s elevated seat directly opposite. The van measured 5’3¾” in the vast majority of D cars, exceptions being 14-16 (6’3¼”), 20-21 and 23 (5’6 15/16”) and 31-32 (5’9½”).

Passenger compartments varied in length and number. Each was rated for ten passengers, five on each bench, but the width of any given compartment could be anywhere from 5’9¼” to 7’3⅞”, with up to three sizes in any given vehicle.

As of 1915 there were 32 carriages destined to later become D type driving trailers. These were AC cars 5, 8, 10, 12, 17, 28, 29, 32, 34, 39, 52, 63, 70 and 139-143; ABC cars 17-20 and BC cars 6-7, 12, 29-30, 32, 36 and 39-41.

Between 1919-1921, all the AC First-class cars listed became ACD, first-class driving trailers, except Nos. 63 and 70; all BC Second-class cars listed bar 12BC became BCD, and none of the ABC cars went to a classed electric carriage. By 1924, all thirty-two carriages had become first-class D cars.

All the ex-AC types had seven compartments except 63 and 70; those and the ex-ABC and BC cars had eight compartments. In all cases, three compartments were reserved for smoking passengers and the rest reserved for non-smoking.

The first swing-door D car withdrawn was 21D in 1951. 26D and 9D followed in 1956 and 1957 respectively, and withdrawals of the Swingdoor fleet accelerated from there. 18D and 22D were removed from service in 1962, and the next year took 4, 8, 10, 13, 20, 23 and 30. 3 and 5 in 1964, 7 and 11 in 1965, 14D in 1966 and 28D in 1967, then a short reprieve.

The final withdrawals were 1-2, 6, 15-17, 19, 25, 27 and 31-32 in 1973 and 12 and 29D in 1974.

24D stayed on register until 1979, when it was formally withdrawn for preservation. In 1981 the car was involved in a runaway and sustained damage, but was later repaired.

32D was stored at Newport for a number of years, providing a useful source of spare parts for the restoration of 12BT and 24D; it was scrapped in 2008. This car retained the wooden headstocks with which it was built, which would have made operational restoration difficult.

Trailers – AT, BT, T
This group encompasses one hundred and fifteen carriages, at different stages.

As of 1910, the bogie passenger compartment fleet consisted of a range of A, AB, and B type carriages of 45 ft and 50 ft lengths. These were respectively of the first, composite and second class, with capacities around 70 passengers each. Most of the carriages dated from the late 1880s, though 51B and 54B entered service in 1900, 5A and 77B were built in 1902, and 63B and 66B were built in 1904 and 1905 respectively. From approximately 1908 to 1922, the bogie passenger fleet had underframes and bodies extended to increase the capacity of any given train (by wasting less space with couplers and buffers). Typically, two compartments were added to one end of each carriage, with a final over-body length of 57'4½". Originally the majority of these carriages had seven compartments of 6'3 1/8", with two more added at only 6'0 11/16" each.

The four exceptions were carriages 49B, 51B, 20AB, and 79AB (108B from 1911). These cars had the same external dimensions, except that 49B and 51B were originally built with eight compartments of 6'1 5/16" and a ninth added at 6'11½"; 20AB and 79AB (108B) originally had seven compartments - three First class in the centre at 6'11" each, flanked by two Second class compartments of 5'9¼" each; later two standard 6'0 11/16" compartments were added at one end.

By the time carriages were being withdrawn from steam-hauled service for conversion to electric train trailers, the eventually-converted fleet comprised 25 x 1st-class cars in the range 1A to 149A (very few consecutive, but the majority numbered 100 or higher), and a further 89 2nd class carriages, most in the number range 1-222 plus 129B and 134B. Those carriages were withdrawn and refitted with electric lighting and control cables for motor communication.

The conversions did not happen immediately, but by 1921 1st class trailers 1AT-12AT and 14AT-18AT, and conversion work was progressing for the fleet of second class trailers 1BT through (roughly) 100BT. In 1921 it was decided that having class segregation among each class of the suburban fleet was too difficult to manage appropriately, and so the trailers all became first class and the motors all second class. The AT carriages became 1-12T and 14-18T respectively, joined by 13T and 19-26T which had not been converted in time for the AT classification. BT cars became 27T to 111T, plus 126T. 109T, 110T, 111T, and 126T had been the pre-conversion odd vehicles 20AB, 49B, 51B, and 108B.

As Tait-type rollingstock in the 1925-onwards batches entered service, some swing-door T cars were returned to steam passenger service, with modifications for electric running removed and gas lighting re-instated, but extra compartments retained. The first three were 87BT, 94BT and 96BT. It is likely that if they had been converted to T trailer cars, they may have been numbered 113T, 120T and 122T, and it is possible that 126T had not been intended as the highest numbered class member. These three carriages were restored to their 1910 identities of 54, 63 and 66B respectively on 29 January 1924. All three cars had the same alternate compartment arrangement as 110T and 111T. However, in practice the numbers 112T-125T and 127T-199T were never filled with swing-door rollingstock.

In 1929 further carriages were deemed surplus to electric fleet requirements, and carriages 6, 19, 20, 21, 24, 26, 43, 39, 100, and 101T were converted back to B type country carriages, however instead of regaining their former numbers, they became 162-171B, these being the next available after the highest numbered B carriage at the time.

A further re-classification of First class T cars was made in 1940, when a shortage of second class accommodation on the suburban system became evident, the situation being exacerbated by the Second World War and its associated petrol rationing. Fourteen of the swing-door trailer fleet were re-coded to BT, although keeping their T fleet numbers. This conversion involved the upholstered seats being swapped for second-class wooden benches (with cushions); signage on the carriage sides was altered to reflect this. The carriages so treated were 4, 8 and 12 in 1940, followed by 29, 36, 38, 41, 42, 45, 64, 77, 79, 85 and 87 in 1941.

In 1954 some of the cars converted away from electric stock in 1929 returned to the swing-door electric fleet. 162B and 163B returned to their previous identities of 6T and 19T respectively, but 165B, 168B, 171B and 169B became T cars 20, 21, 24, and 26, ignoring their previous identities of 21, 43, 101, and 39T.

In 1958 class designation on the Melbourne suburban system was abolished altogether, meaning that the fourteen BT trailers were no longer any different from the rest of the fleet, all cars receiving upholsters seating as the new standard. However, those cars kept their BT code, and they were joined by seventeen other vehicles to make a total 31 BT trailers. These later conversions (and probably the earlier ones as well) included a shunter's cock being added similar to Tait G cars, to aid shunting Units (M-T-BT-) onto Blocks (M-T-T-M). This resulted in 7-car dogbox trains being formed as M-T-BT+M-T-T-M, releasing the G carriages for other services.

The first two withdrawals of T swingdoor cars were in 1953 and 1956, with 46T and 86T respectively. 26 (ex 39), 65, 70 and 166T were withdrawn in 1957, and twelve cars knocked out in 1958. Mass withdrawals started at the end of 1961 with 91T, and an average of ten cars per year were withdrawn from then through to the end of 1974. Some cars were converted to workmen's sleepers, but the majority had valuable fittings removed, then were railed out to Allendale on the former North Creswick - Daylesford line, and burned. Withdrawals in this period averaged eight cars per year; fewer in the period 1967-1972 as the Hitachi fleet was designed and introduced into service, but many more either side of that period. The last two in service, withdrawn during the first half of 1974, were 76BT and 80T.

The carriages converted from steam to electric then back to steam but which did not return to electric later on - 54B, 64B, 66B, 164B, 166B, 167B and 170B - were withdrawn largely in line with others of that class.

Set configuration
When the conversion project was halted, the swingdoor fleet equalled 32 Driving Trailers, 112 regular Trailers, 144 Motors (including the double-ended (ABM) and high-powered (AM) motors). The core of the Tait fleet had also been delivered by 1927.

For the majority of the day, the Blocks would have run most services, with the single motor cars running short distances like Ashburton and Hurstbridge, and the Pairs are known to have been reserved for flatter lines like Newport-Altona, if not worked in pairs (M-D+M-D) in place of a regular Block. In peak hours on quieter lines, the standard Block was supplemented with a Pair; on the busiest routes, a Unit would be attached. As noted in the Tait article, during the Easter and Christmas seasons, the Tait G cars (T-type trailers with gas lighting available as well as electric) would be withdrawn from suburban service and utilised as extra capacity on country trains. Double-block sets of M-T-T-M+M-T-T-M were never used in normal service.

1956 roster
As of 1956, 218 Swing Door carriages were rostered for regular use (in conjunction with 584 Tait carriages). At the time 282 Swing Door vehicles were available, after accounting for 18M and 44M converted to Tait, three trailers returned to steam-hauled use, 122M and 123M withdrawn 1956, 156M permanently allocated to Jolimont Yard and 157M in use as a parcels van.

These could be divided into three main groups - St Kilda and Port Melbourne, Box Hill, and Clifton Hill, plus a handful of additional vehicles.

The St Kilda and Port Melbourne group had a total of 37 vehicles allocated, organised as three sets M-D-D-M-D-T-M, two M-D-D-M-D-M and two M-D.

For Box Hill, to Lilydale and Upper Ferntree Gully, 14 sets were operated as M-T-T-M-G-T-M (all Swing Door except the Tait G car), plus two sets of ABM-D for Camberwell to Alamein shuttles, totalling 88 vehicles out of 102.

Trains from Princes Bridge through Clifton Hill to Hurstbridge and Thomastown were formed by 13 M-T-T-M-BT-T-M sets plus three more with a Tait G substituting for the BT, and a set of M-Tait G-ABM for the Eltham to Hurstbridge shuttles, adding to 111 out of 115 carriages.

Finally, four AM motors were paired with regular M motors for use on the E trains to Healesville and Stony Point, though two of those sets included a pair of Tait cars, and Altona had two swing-door Motors coupled to Tait driving trailers.

The total roster required 114 of 126 available M cars, 93 of 97 T, 3 of 6 ABM, 4 of 6 AM, 13 of 15 BT but only 19 of 32 D.

Equipment
General Electric traction equipment was fitted to the trains, of the same type as that in the Tait trains and enabling the trains to be operated in mixed sets using multiple-unit train control.

Conversions and alterations
Six Swing Door M cars were converted to parcels vans (numbered 10CM to 15CM), and two M cars, 156M and 113M, were modified for use as shunters in the Jolimont Workshops.

Retirement
From the late 1950s to 1970 the swing door trains were replaced by the Harris EMU trains. The last 7-car Swing Door train was withdrawn in February 1973, with the remainder (in smaller formations) lasting on the St Kilda and Port Melbourne lines only until the end of that year. A special "farewell" day was run on 26 January 1974. The Parcel vans remained in service until the mid-1980s, and the workshop shunters until the 1990s.

During their long service lives, many Motor cars had their original fabricated bogies replaced by newer cast-frame bogies; these cast-frame bogies from scrapped Swing Door trains were recycled for use under the Y class diesel locomotives built in the 1960s.

Preservation
Only a handful of cars survived into preservation.
 8M: Newport Railway Museum, static.
 19M, 69M, 93M (currently with ElecRail at Newport for restoration), 139M: Previously featured at Sandhurst Town near Bendigo; moved to Acacia Gardens caravan park in Mooroopna in 2009. 
 78M: Body privately owned, near Bendigo
 113M: Owned by VicTrack, in the care of Elecrail, stored.
 133M: Body privately owned, at Epsom.
 143M: Body privately owned, near Bendigo
 156M: Owned by VicTrack, in the care of Elecrail, stored.
 94BT: Body privately owned, at Benalla.
 10CM: Owned by VicTrack, stored. In 1991, operational at Seymour with SLSPG.
 12CM (Formerly, now with ElecRail at Newport for spare parts for 93M) & 13CM: Mornington Railway, stored.

A further four carriages, 107M, 12AT, 24D and 137M, were owned by VicTrack and stored at Newport Workshops West Block under the care of Elecrail. The two motor cars were operational and the trailer car was "a few weeks away from restoration" when at about 1am on 4 March 2015, a fire caused massive damage to that part of the complex. The remains of 12AT and 24D were cut up; the frame, undergear and bogies from 137M have been retained pending assessment, and 107M's cab is the only section of the body to have survived.

 32D: Was stored for spare parts/future restoration at Newport until 2008, when the vehicle was scrapped by VicTrack.

References

External links

 Peter J. Vincent: Swing Door Electric Stock
 Vicsig.net Swing Door Trains

Melbourne rail rollingstock
Electric multiple units of Victoria (Australia)
1500 V DC multiple units of Victoria